Krarup is a Danish surname. In 2004 it was Denmark's 332nd most common surname. Notable people with this surname include:

 Carl Emil Krarup (1872–1909), Danish telegraph engineer
 Kai Aage Krarup (born 1915), Danish equestrian
 Ole Krarup (1935–2017), Danish politician
 Søren Krarup (born 1937), Danish pastor
 Theodora Krarup (1862–1941), Danish painter

References